The Captain & the Kid is the twenty-eighth studio album by English musician Elton John, released in 2006. It is his second autobiographical album with lyricist Bernie Taupin, picking up where Captain Fantastic and the Brown Dirt Cowboy (1975) left off. The Captain & the Kid chronicles the events in their lives over the intervening three decades.

The Captain & the Kid reached No. 6 in the UK, a considerable improvement over the performance of John's preceding Peachtree Road in 2004, which peaked at No. 21. Captain reached No. 18 in the US, before quickly falling off the charts. At concerts in early 2007, John made clear his dissatisfaction with Interscope Records' promotion of the album, having threatened to terminate his contract with the label and because of that, John did not release a solo album until 2013's The Diving Board.

Background
Interscope Records announced that there would be no physical single released from this album as the emphasis is on presenting the album as a body of work, making the album his third after Tumbleweed Connection and Leather Jackets to not have any Top 40 singles in the UK (as John, during that time, still hit the Top 40 in the US Adult Contemporary chart).

However, a radio single would be released in "The Bridge". The album's booklet has photos of John and Taupin all throughout their career, and in the lyrics section, two songs are included, "Across the River Thames" and "12", which do not appear on the album. "Across the River Thames" was available as a free download to anyone who played the CD on a computer. The song "And the House Fell Down" is based (metaphorically) on the story The Three Little Pigs. This is the first album recorded by John and Taupin to show them together on the front cover. 

It was also the last studio album to feature Guy Babylon on keyboards; he died in 2009. This was also Bob Birch's last appearance on any of John's solo studio albums before his own death in August 2012 (Birch last appeared on the Gnomeo and Juliet soundtrack).

Track listing

Other bonus tracks

Personnel 
 Elton John – lead vocals, acoustic piano
 Guy Babylon – keyboards
 Davey Johnstone – guitars, banjo, mandolin, harmonica, backing vocals
 Bob Birch – bass, backing vocals
 Nigel Olsson – drums, backing vocals
 John Mahon – percussion, backing vocals
 Matt Still – backing vocals
 Arthur – "woof-bells"

Producer Matt Still noted during an interview that in "Just Like Noah's Ark", Elton's black and white spaniel dog Arthur "barked in the middle of [the recording], because John Mahon was playing a cowbell, and the cowbell freaked him out. So he ran over to John and started barking at him right in the middle of a take. It's funny, just randomly he happened to hit the beats and he barked in time. So I recorded it and we actually kept him in there."

The sampled "woof-bells" can be heard in place of the cowbell on the track.

Production 
 Produced by Elton John and Matt Still
 Recorded and Mixed by Matt Still
 Recording Assistant – Tom Rickert
 Mix Assistant – Dan Porter
 Recorded at Center Stage (Atlanta, GA).
 Mixed at Townhouse Studios (London, England).
 Mastered by Bob Ludwig at Gateway Mastering (Portland, ME).
 Studio Coordinator – Adrian Collee
 Drum Technician – Chris Sobchack
 Guitar Technician – Rick Salazar
 Piano Tuner – Andy Williams
 Director of Ops – Bob Halley
 Cover Photography – Ryan McGinley
 Art Direction and Design – David Costa
 Management – Keith Bradley, Mark Mercuriadis and Frank Presland.

Charts

Certifications

References

External links

Elton John albums
2006 albums
Concept albums
Albums produced by Elton John
Sequel albums
Mercury Records albums
Interscope Geffen A&M Records albums
Interscope Records albums